Marcăuți is a village in Dubăsari District, Moldova.

Natives
Ilie Cătărău, Bessarabian Romanian spy and adventurer

References

Villages of Dubăsari District
Populated places on the Dniester